Peter Trump (born 3 December 1950) is a German former field hockey player who was a member of the West-German team that won the gold medal at the 1972 Summer Olympics in Munich. He also competed at the 1976 Summer Olympics.

References

External links
 

1950 births
Living people
German male field hockey players
Olympic field hockey players of West Germany
Field hockey players at the 1972 Summer Olympics
Field hockey players at the 1976 Summer Olympics
Olympic medalists in field hockey
Medalists at the 1972 Summer Olympics
Olympic gold medalists for West Germany
20th-century German people